, also known as SATV, is a television network headquartered in Shizuoka Prefecture, Japan. The station, which began broadcasting on July 1, 1978, is an affiliate of ANN.

History
SATV is the 3rd commercial television station in Shizuoka prefecture. When it was founded, the company name was Shizuoka Prefectural Television (静岡けんみんテレビ, SKT), and it was affiliated with NNN and ANN. After Shizuoka Daiichi Television founded, Shizuoka Prefectural Television became a sole affiliate of ANN. In 1993, it renamed to Shizuoka Asahi TV.

On March 23, 2005, SATV began testing its digital terrestrial transmissions, which would formally commence on November 1 of that year.

References

External links
 Official website 

All-Nippon News Network
1976 establishments in Japan
Japanese-language television stations
Mass media in Shizuoka (city)
Television channels and stations established in 1976
Television stations in Japan